Lithophaga truncata is a date mussel, a marine bivalve mollusc in the family Mytilidae.

References
 Miller M & Batt G, Reef and Beach Life of New Zealand, William Collins (New Zealand) Ltd, Auckland, New Zealand 1973
 Powell A. W. B., New Zealand Mollusca, William Collins Publishers Ltd, Auckland, New Zealand 1979 

Bivalves of New Zealand
truncata
Bivalves described in 1843